The Ili Turks are a Turkic unrecognized ethnic group in China native to Ili Kazakh Autonomous Prefecture in Northern Xinjiang of China, and Kazakhstan. They call themselves "Turk" or "Zhonghua Minzu". Their oral history says they came from the Ferghana Valley, Uzbekistan. The distinct Ili Turki language belongs to the Karluk languages, but is listed as Uzbek by Chinese authorities.

The Ili Turks are nomadic and good at herding. There are many unique animal husbandry words in their language.

References 

Turkic peoples of Asia
Ethnic groups in Xinjiang
Ethnic groups in China
Indigenous peoples of East Asia
Herding
Nomads